Roosters is a 1993 American dramatic film with a screenplay by Milcha Sanchez-Scott that is adapted from her play of the same name. The film premiered at the Toronto International Film Festival in 1993 before being released in the United States in 1995.

Plot
Gallo Morales (Olmos) returns home after being imprisoned for seven years for murdering a man over a cockfight. His family welcomes him back with mixed feelings. While his daughter Angela (Lassez) is eager to have him back, his son Hector (Nucci) feels otherwise. Hector desires to leave behind the farm and wants to use the family's prize-winning cock, which he has inherited from his grandfather, to win money in order to move his family away. However, Gallo has returned from prison determined to continue the business and to raise a new flock of roosters. Hector and Gallo soon clash over their differing goals.

Cast
 Edward James Olmos as Gallo Morales
 Sônia Braga as Juana Morales
 María Conchita Alonso as Chata
 Danny Nucci as Hector Morales
 Sarah Lassez as Angela Estelle Morales

References

External links
 
 
 

1993 films
1993 drama films
Films directed by Robert M. Young
Films scored by David Kitay
American drama films
Cockfighting in film
1990s English-language films
1990s American films